The Old Curiosity Shop is a 1934 British drama film directed by Thomas Bentley and starring Elaine Benson, Ben Webster and Hay Petrie. It is an adaptation of Charles Dickens' 1841 novel The Old Curiosity Shop.

Production
The film was produced by British International Pictures, one of the two most prominent British film studios of the time, at its base at Elstree Studios. Bentley was a well-established director who worked on several of the company's presigous historical films during the decade. He had previously directed a number of Dickens adaptations during the silent era, but this was his only Dickens talkie. The film sought to achieve a "painterly" effect in its interpretation of the original work. The recreation of the grotesque elements of Dickens' novel has led to it being described as an "expressionist nightmare".

Cast
 Elaine Benson as Nell 
 Ben Webster as The Grandfather 
 Hay Petrie as Quilp 
 Beatrix Thomson as Quilp's Wife 
 Gibb McLaughlin as Sampson Brass
 Lily Long as Sally Brass 
 Reginald Purdell as Dick Swiveller 
 Polly Ward as The Marchioness 
 James Harcourt as The Single Gentleman 
 J. Fisher White as The Schoolmaster 
 Dick Tubb as Codin 
 Roddy Hughes as Short 
 Amy Veness as Mrs. Jarley 
 Peter Penrose as Kit 
 Vic Filmer as Tom Scott

References

Bibliography
 Harper, Sue. Picturing the Past: The Rise and Fall of the British Costume Film. British Film Institute, 1994.

External links

1934 films
1934 drama films
Films shot at British International Pictures Studios
1930s English-language films
Films based on The Old Curiosity Shop
Films directed by Thomas Bentley
Films set in England
Films set in the 1840s
British drama films
British black-and-white films
1930s British films